The following units served the Union Army during the American Civil War.

Infantry

Militia infantry

Cavalry

Artillery

1st New York Light Artillery
Battery A, 1st New York Light Artillery
Battery B, 1st New York Light Artillery
Battery C, 1st New York Light Artillery
Battery D, 1st New York Light Artillery
Battery E, 1st New York Light Artillery
Battery F, 1st New York Light Artillery
Battery G, 1st New York Light Artillery
Battery H, 1st New York Light Artillery
Battery I, 1st New York Light Artillery
Battery K, 1st New York Light Artillery
Battery L, 1st New York Light Artillery
Battery M, 1st New York Light Artillery

Engineers

Brigades

Citations

See also
 List of armories and arsenals in New York City and surrounding counties
 List of American Civil War units by state

References
 New York regimental index at civilwararchive.com

External links 
 New York Muster-In Volumes: 1,2,4,5,6,7,8
 New York Muster-Out Volumes: 1,2,3,4,5,6,7
47th New York Volunteer Infantry and the Battle of Olustee
48th New York Volunteer Infantry and the Battle of Olustee
115th New York Volunteer Infantry and the Battle of Olustee
Rosters of the New York Volunteers during the Civil War

New York regiments
 
Civil War